The San Luis Obispo Regional Transit Authority is the provider of intercity mass transportation in San Luis Obispo County, California, with service between most cities in the county: Arroyo Grande, Atascadero, Paso Robles, Grover Beach, Morro Bay, Pismo Beach, Cambria, San Simeon, Los Osos, Cayucos, and San Luis Obispo. Hourly routes operate Monday - Friday, with more limited Saturday & Sunday service. The base travel fare is $1.50-$3 each way, or a Regional 24-Hour Pass may be purchased for $5, good for unlimited trips on all fixed-routes in the county. Five routes are branded as part of the SLORTA (9, 10, 12, 14, and 15). RTA also operates fixed route transit service in the Five Cities Area for South County Transit (Routes 21, 23, 24, & 25) and the Avila Beach Trolley on a seasonal runs.

External links
 SLO RTA
 RTA Schedules
 SCAT Schedules

Bus transportation in California
Public transportation in San Luis Obispo County, California
Transit agencies in California
San Luis Obispo, California
Arroyo Grande, California
Atascadero, California
Morro Bay
Paso Robles, California
Government of San Luis Obispo County, California